Neal Hughes (born July 2, 1980) is a former professional Canadian football player for the Saskatchewan Roughriders of the Canadian Football League.  Hughes, who is of Métis heritage, signed with the Riders as a free agent after completing his university career with the Regina Rams.

Early life
Hughes was born and raised in Regina, and has played all of his football in the city, starting out in the Regina Minor Football (RMF) system at the age of 7. He played peewee and midget, moving up to the Thom Collegiate Trojans for his high school football career. During his career with the Rams, he was named the university's Male Athlete of the Year in 2003.

Saskatchewan Roughriders
After an outstanding collegiate career, Hughes signed a free agent contract with the Saskatchewan Roughriders in April 2004. Under head coach Danny Barrett, he spent much of his time as backup fullback to Chris Szarka, while also playing on special teams. He had his first reception against Winnipeg in the Banjo Bowl in 2007 and had his first carry on October 21, 2007 against the Hamilton Tiger-Cats and scored his first CFL touchdown five days later against the Edmonton Eskimos on a four-yard run. He also added a receiving touchdown in the West Final playoff game against the BC Lions.

In 2008, Hughes enjoyed a breakout season recording 35 carries for 130 yards and four touchdowns and 16 receptions for 187 yards and three touchdowns. His seven touchdowns was only second on the team behind Wes Cates, despite playing in only 12 games due to a leg injury that took him out of most of August and September. Hughes also led the team in special teams tackles, with 21 to his credit. Due to a nagging knee injury, Hughes sat out for 11 games in 2009 and saw a diminished role in the offense, seeing his first touch of the season in the second-to-last regular season game.

Hughes had a personal web site. He announced his retirement on May 20, 2015.

Hughes was inducted into the Roughriders' Plaza of Honour.

References

External links
Saskatchewan Roughriders bio

1980 births
Living people
Canadian football fullbacks
Sportspeople from Regina, Saskatchewan
Players of Canadian football from Saskatchewan
Regina Rams players
Saskatchewan Roughriders players
Métis sportspeople